The superior extensor retinaculum of the foot (transverse crural ligament) is the upper part of the extensor retinaculum of foot which extends from the ankle to the heelbone.

The superior extensor retinaculum  binds down the tendons of extensor digitorum longus, extensor hallucis longus, peroneus tertius, and tibialis anterior as they descend on the front of the tibia and fibula; under it are found also the anterior tibial vessels and deep peroneal nerve.

It is found on the lateral side of the lower leg, attached laterally to the lower end of the fibula, and medially to the tibia; above it is continuous with the fascia of the leg.

Additional images

See also
 Peroneal retinacula

References 

Lower limb anatomy